Mende is a surname. Notable people with the surname include:

Dirk-Ulrich Mende (born 1957), German politician and Lord Mayor of the town of Celle, Germany
Erich Mende (1916–1998), German politician
Erling von Mende (born 1940), German sinologist
Gerhard von Mende (1904–1963), German academic, administrator under the Nazi regime
Gunther Mende (born 1952), German record producer
Hildegard Mende (born 1922), German concentration camp guard during World War II
Kaoru Mende (born 1950), Japanese lighting designer
Septi Mende (born 1986), Indonesian tennis player
Sven Mende (born 1994), German footballer